Holodipterus gogoensis is an extinct species of lungfish from the late Devonian period of Europe and Australia.

References

Prehistoric lungfish
Prehistoric fish of Australia
Devonian fish of Europe